Dolan (Uyghur: دولان, Долан; Simplified Chinese: 刀朗 or 多朗) refers to a people or region of what is now Xinjiang Province, China. People who call themselves Dolan can be found in Awat County, the Yarkand River valley, the Tarim River valley and the Lop Nur region of present-day Xinjiang. Though modern Dolan people now speak the vernacular dialect (usually Uyghur), the term refers to an earlier culture and civilization in the region. The history of this people is little known. Some scholars and travelers believed the Dolan of the Yarkand River valley to be a Kazakh or Kyrgyz group that settled in the area during the Qing dynasty. This belief was based on their noticeably different physiognomy and language and their semi-nomadic lifestyles.

John Avetaranian met some of them and mentioned it in his autobiography.

Some of the aspects of Dolan culture that remain to the present day include the unique style of music and dance. The music is performed with chants, plucked and bowed string instruments and drums. This music is now grouped into a category of Uyghur Muqam music, although the instruments and musical characteristics are very different from the Uyghur 12 Muqam.

The plucked-string instruments used to perform Dolan Muqam, Dolan Meshrep or Dolan Pls are different from their counterparts in Uyghur folk music and usually contain a large set of sympathetic strings that resonate with certain key tones, similar to the lutes and fiddles of India and the near east.

References

 Svanberg, Ingvar. “Ethnic Categorizations and Cultural Diversity in Xinjiang: The Dolans along the Yarkand River.” Central Asiatic Journal, 40/2 (1996): 260–282.

Ethnic groups in China
History of Xinjiang
Uyghur sub-ethnic groups